Lori Meyers is a Spanish indie rock pop group from the little village of Loja in the Province of Granada.

History
The group was founded in early 1998 by Antonio López, Alejandro Méndez, Julián Méndez and Alfredo Núñez. After several Demos like, "Las cinco Ventanas" and "El Viaje de Estudios de mis Neuronas" they signed their first record deal with DJ Valdi and Houston Party Records in early 2004. In February of that same year they recorded their first work "Viaje de Estudios" in the ADJ Shelter with producer Mac McCaughan, singer Superchunk, going on sale in May 2004. This first album was very well received by media as Radio 3 and indie press making Ojo Critico a RNE program offer the Modern Music Prize the same year.

In June 2005 they recorded their second album Hostal Pimodan at Odds Studio in El Puerto de Santa María with Thom Monahan as producer. This album releases in October 2005 in a climate of disagreements with his record company. This situation ends in a few months with the break between Lori Meyers and Houston Party and as a consequence, they sign by the multinational Universal Music. During this period the group expands to five components as Sergio Martín is incorporated in the work of guitar, keyboards and bass. In April 2006 Hostal Pimodan reissued with a dual format with the cover which the band originally wanted. In late 2006 Julian Mendez left the band and re-formed into quartet, Sergio Martin on bass and vocals.

After nearly two years of a non-stop tour Antonio López, Alejandro Méndez, Alfredo Nunez and Sergio Martin venture into the studio to record their third album. Cronolanea was record in October 2007 in Gismo 7 Studios in Motril, with the production of Ken Coomer and engineer Charlie Brocco. This work goes on sale in March 2008 with Universal. For the live presentation of Cronolánea Miguel Martin joined the band in second guitars and keyboards; and Antonio Lomas with the percussion and drums. In this way the group becomes a sextet. Moreover, this album was nominated by the independent magazine Mondosonoro as the best Spanish album in 2008 and the band on his own has more than a hundred concerts. In the middle of the tour, back in January 2009 Sergio Martin left the group and he's replaced by Miguel López as bassist. In 2009 they won the Granada Joven award and the Andalusian Youth Arts Award.

In January 2010, Lori Meyers with soundman David Sutil travelled to Los Angeles, USA to record Cuando el destino nos alcance. This time the album's production is undertaken by Sebastian Krys, renowned producer; Grammys owner, and hits the market in May 2010. 

On 29 November 2011, Lori Meyers receive the best tour of the year award from Rolling Stone magazine. [2]

Their latest album, Impronta, [4] produced again by Sebastian Krys and with the addition of Ricky Falkner, was recorded between Alomartes, a small town in their native Granada and Los Ángeles, USA, during the last months of 2012, it was released on 19 March 2013.

Furthermore, in November 2013 Lori Meyers composed a song for the soundtrack of The Hunger Games: Catching Fire,  Hombre a tierra included on the CD in Spanish-speaking countries with other international songs from the soundtrack with artists like Coldplay, Lorde o The National.

Discography
 Viaje de estudios (2004)
 Hostal Pimodán (2005)
 Hostal Pimodán (reedición) (2CD) (2006)
 Cronolánea (2008)
 Viaje de estudios (reedición) (2010)
 Cuando el destino nos alcance (2010)
 Impronta (2013)
 Espacios Infinitos (2021)

EP and singles
 Las cinco ventanas (EP) (2000)
 Ya lo sabes (EP) (2004)
 La caza (EP) (2005)
 Dilema/Televisión (Single) (2006)
 Luces de neón (Single) (2008)
 Mi realidad (Single Vinilo)(2010)

Clips
 Tokio ya no nos quiere
 Dilema
 Luces de neón
 Alta fidelidad
 Alta fidelidad Ganador Notodofilmfest
 Luciérnagas y mariposas
 Mi realidad
 ¿Aha han vuelto?
 Religión
 Rumba en atmósfera cero
 Planilandia
 Emborracharme
 Corazón elocuente

Tribute albums
 Homenaje a Los Ángeles – Intervenciones estelares (2005)

Curiosities
Its name comes from the song 'Lori Meyers' of the American punk band NOFX appearing on their 1994 album Punk in Drublic. The song is about Lori Meyers a childhood friend of the singer Fat Mike, who works as a porn actress. He recognizes her while watching one of her films. The song goes on to tell how the singer tries to convince Lori Meyers to stop doing this, but she tells him she prefers to work in the porn industry rather than in a factory.

References

External links 
 lorimeyers.net

Spanish indie rock groups
Musical groups established in 1998